The Phoenix Skywalker is a series of German paramotors that was designed and produced by Phoenix Gleitschirmantriebe of Würselen for powered paragliding. Now out of production, when it was available the aircraft was supplied complete and ready-to-fly.

Design and development
The Skywalker was designed to comply with the US FAR 103 Ultralight Vehicles rules as well as European regulations. It features a paraglider-style wing, single-place accommodation and a single engine in pusher configuration with a 2.25:1 ratio reduction drive and a  diameter four-bladed composite propeller. The use of a four-bladed propeller allows a smaller cage size and reduces the overall dimensions of the aircraft.

As is the case with all paramotors, take-off and landing is accomplished by foot. Inflight steering is accomplished via handles that actuate the canopy brakes, creating roll and yaw.

Variants
Skywalker 210
Model with a  Solo 210 engine in pusher configuration with a 2.25:1 ratio reduction drive and a  diameter four-bladed composite propeller.
Skywalker 330
Model with a  Hirth F-33 engine in pusher configuration with a 2.25:1 ratio reduction drive and a  diameter four-bladed composite propeller.

Specifications (Skywalker 210)

References

External links
Phoenix Skywalker 330 info and image page
Skywalker
2000s German ultralight aircraft
Single-engined pusher aircraft
Paramotors